Typist is a person who types, a clerical worker who writes documents, using a typewriter.

Skills and occupations
Typist may also refer to:
Data entry clerk, someone who types data into a database via a computer or terminal.
Audio typist, someone who types letters, books and other documents using an audio source (e.g. dictaphone)
Copy typist, someone who types letters, books and other documents using printed or handwritten sources.
Shorthand typist, someone who uses a high speed writing system to record speech.

Other
Typist, someone who discriminates against others based on their association with a standard social construction.

Occupations